50minutes is a 2006 charity album, consisting of indie, folk, electronica, and alternative artists from across the world, with all proceeds going to the Medical Foundation. The concept of the album is 50 one-minute long tracks from 50 different artists.  It is compiled together in such a way as to produce a continuously flowing piece of music of exactly 50 minutes length.

Track listing

Bonus Audio
There is a bonus interactive CD ROM on the disc.  This has a selection of streamable bonus songs. These include Exercise1's favorite songs that did not make the final compilation due to bands recording more than one song or submissions that were entered past the deadline.  The track listing for these songs was:

References

External links
official 50minutes webpage
Medical Foundation official webpage
Huw Stephens BBC Radio 1 show – currently playing a track a week from the album

50minutes
50minutes